André Travetto (born 12 December 1948) is a French former professional footballer who played as a defender.

Career 
Travetto was a youth product of SO Caillolais. He joined Cannes in 1967 and made his played his first minutes as a professional footballer at the club. In 1969, Travetto joined Aix. After two years, he transferred to Avignon.

Travetto played his first season in the Division 1 with Bastia in 1973–74. He made a total of 50 appearances across two seasons for the club before joining Paris Saint-Germain.

On 28 February 1976, Travetto made his PSG debut in a 3–0 Coupe de France win against Lens. He played his final match for the club on 16 June 1976, a 2–1 league loss against Monaco.

After football 
Travetto retired after 10 years of playing football in the three highest tiers of France. He later went to live in Corsica.

Career statistics

References 

Living people
1948 births
People from Pau, Pyrénées-Atlantiques
Sportspeople from Pau, Pyrénées-Atlantiques
French footballers
Association football defenders
Paris Saint-Germain F.C. players
Pays d'Aix FC players
SC Bastia players
AC Avignonnais players
AS Cannes players
Ligue 1 players
Ligue 2 players
French Division 3 (1971–1993) players
Footballers from Nouvelle-Aquitaine